The Socotra Island blind snake (Myriopholis filiformis) is a species of snake in the family Leptotyphlopidae.

References

Myriopholis
Reptiles described in 1899
Endemic fauna of Socotra
Taxobox binomials not recognized by IUCN